The 2001 Stella Artois Championships was a men's tennis tournament played on grass courts at the Queen's Club in London, United Kingdom and was part of the International Series of the 2001 ATP Tour. It was the 99th edition of the tournament and was held from 11 June until 17 June 2001. Third-seeded Lleyton Hewitt won his second consecutive singles title at the event.

Finals

Singles

 Lleyton Hewitt defeated  Tim Henman 7–6(7–3), 7–6(7–3)
 It was Hewitt's 2nd title of the year and the 10th of his career.

Doubles

 Bob Bryan /  Mike Bryan defeated  Eric Taino /  David Wheaton 6–3, 6–2
 It was Bob Bryan's 2nd title of the year and the 2nd of his career. It was Mike Bryan's 2nd title of the year and the 2nd of his career.

References

External links
 Official website
 ATP tournament profile

 
Stella Artois Championships
Queen's Club Championships
Stella Artois Championships
Stella Artois Championships
Stella Artois Championships